Kallapetti Singaram was an Indian actor who acted in over 100 Tamil films from the 1966 to 1990. He primarily played comedic characters, mostly in minor roles in films directed by K. Bhagyaraj. His most notable movies include Suvarilladha Chiththirangal, Oru Kai Osai, Andha 7 Naatkal, Mouna Geethangal, Indru Poi Naalai Vaa, and Enga Ooru Pattukaran.

Early life 
Kallapetti Singaram owned a successful drama troupe and staged many plays. When Bhagyaraj became acquainted with Singaram he was impressed by his expressive features, acting style, and body language. Later, when Bhagyaraj became a successful director himself, he gave Singaram several opportunities to appear in his films.

Film career 
Bhagyaraj first introduced Singaram in Suvarilladha Chiththirangal. At this point, Singaram had already had a minor role in Motor Sundaram Pillai, a movie released in 1966. Even though Singaram only played minor roles in many of Bhagyaraj's films, Bhagyaraj was the only director to give him any significant movie parts.

Death 
Kallapetti Singaram died during the filming of his last movie, Kizhakku Vasal, on 15 April 1990 at the age of 52.

Filmography

References 

1990 deaths
20th-century Indian male actors
Tamil male actors
1938 births